Tobias Björnfot (born 6 April 2001) is a Swedish professional ice hockey defenseman for the Ontario Reign of the American Hockey League (AHL) as a prospect to the Los Angeles Kings of the National Hockey League (NHL). He was drafted 22nd overall by the Kings in the first round of the 2019 NHL Entry Draft.

Playing career
During the 2018–19 season, Björnfot made his SHL and professional debut with Djurgårdens IF on October 20, 2018.

On 21 June 2019, Björnfot was the second player to be selected by the Los Angeles Kings in the 2019 NHL Entry Draft, taken in the first round with the 22nd overall pick, which the Kings acquired from the Toronto Maple Leafs in a trade that sent Jake Muzzin to Toronto. On July 14, 2019, Björnfot was signed to a three-year, entry-level contract with the Kings.

On 8 August 2020, approaching the second year of his entry-level contract the Los Angeles Kings loaned Björnfot to his Swedish club, Djurgårdens IF to continue his development before the commencement of the delayed North American 2020–21 season due to the COVID-19 pandemic.

Career statistics

Regular season and playoffs

International

References

External links
 

2001 births
Living people
Djurgårdens IF Hockey players
Los Angeles Kings draft picks
Los Angeles Kings players
National Hockey League first-round draft picks
Ontario Reign (AHL) players
People from Upplands Väsby Municipality
Swedish ice hockey defencemen
Sportspeople from Stockholm County